The Society of Experimental Test Pilots is an international organization that seeks to promote air safety and contributes to aeronautical advancement by promoting sound aeronautical design and development; interchanging ideas, thoughts and suggestions of the members, assisting in the professional development of experimental pilots, and providing scholarships and aid to members and the families of deceased members.

History
Seventeen pilots attended the first organized meeting of the "Testy Test Pilots Society" on 29 September 1955. This name was to be short-lived, however, as it was changed to The Society of Experimental Test Pilots at the second meeting on 13 October 1955.

The first officers of the society were instated on October 25, 1955, and consisted of Ray Tenhoff, President; Scott Crossfield, Executive Adviser; Dick Johnson, Vice-President; Joe Ozier, Secretary; Lou Everett, Treasurer; and Al Blackburn, Legal Officer. Once the organization and bylaws were established, the society incorporated in the state of California on April 12, 1956. The insigne of the society was designed by C. A. "Al" McDaniel and officially adopted for use in 1956.

The first Awards Banquet was held on October 4, 1957, at the Beverly Hilton Hotel in Beverly Hills, California. It was at the second such banquet, however, that the tradition of the Iven C. Kincheloe Award began. This annual award honors the member who has done the most proficient test work during the previous year. James Gannett of Boeing and Joseph John "Tym" Tymczyszyn of the Civil Aeronautics Administration won the first Kincheloe Award for their work toward certification of America's first turbojet airliner' the Boeing 707. They have been followed each year by the most notable contributors to aviation history.

As of December 31, 2021, the Society had 2,483 members from various countries.

Publications
The society publishes a quarterly known as Cockpit that contains technical articles on flight testing. In addition to Cockpit, the society publishes the proceedings of the annual symposium in Los Angeles to provide a permanent record of flight test progress reports. A periodic newsletter is also provided to members.

Conferences
The Society holds a number of conferences annually:
Los Angeles Symposium and Banquet
San Diego Symposium
East Coast Symposium
Northwest Symposium
European Symposium
Southeast Symposium
Central Symposium
Great Lakes Symposium
Southwest Symposium
Flight Test Safety Workshop

Awards
The Society annually presents a number of awards to recognize notable members of the flight test community. These are: 
Iven C. Kincheloe Award—Outstanding professional accomplishment in the conduct of flight testing
James H. Doolittle Award—Outstanding accomplishment in technical management or engineering
Tony LeVier Flight Test Safety Award—Significant achievement in flight test safety
Herman R. Salmon Technical Publications Award—Outstanding technical paper published in Cockpit magazine
Ray E. Tenhoff Award—Outstanding technical paper presented at the annual SETP symposium
Jack Northrop Award—Outstanding technical paper presented at the annual SETP San Diego symposium
Leroy Grumman Award—Outstanding technical paper presented at the annual SETP East Coast symposium
Friend of the Society—Exceptional and notable contribution to the operation and the objectives of the Society
Spirit of Flight—Significant contribution to the spirit, technology, manufacture, safety and flight test of home-built/sport/classic aircraft

Scholarship foundation
In 1967, the Society created a foundation to provide for scholarships and other forms of educational assistance to children of deceased or disabled Society members. As of 2020, the scholarship foundation has granted over 3.5 million dollars in educational assistance to more than 178 students. Approximately 12 students per year attend school with Society assistance.

Membership and member grades
Membership in the Society is divided into six grades:
Honorary Fellow (HF)—Distinction in the aerospace field and an experimental test pilot at some time during their career
Fellow (F)—Distinction in experimental flight testing and an Associate Fellow for at least one year
Associate Fellow (AF)—Association with experimental flight testing for ten years, experimental test pilot for five years, Member for at least two years
Member (M)—Experimental test pilot not less than one year or crewed space vehicle pilot
Associate Member (AM)—Experimental test pilot or co-pilot from between six months to two years depending on the type of testing
Corporate Member—Organization that has a common interest with the Society in the advancement of crewed aerospace

Notable members
The following is an incomplete list of notable individuals who are or were members of the society:

References

External links
SETP Homepage

Aviation-related professional associations
Organizations established in 1955
Test pilots
1955 establishments in California